Novokramatorsky Mashynobudivny Zavod (English:New Kramatorsk Machinebuilding Plant) is a large heavy equipment manufacturer in Ukraine.  Its abbreviation is NKMZ.  The company produces mining equipment; metallurgy equipment; rolling mills, forges, blast furnaces, ore crushers, presses, and other industrial process equipment.  The company manufactures propeller shafts for icebreakers and components for submarines According to its website, the company has designed and constructed over 18 mining complexes.

The company is based in the city of Kramatorsk, in Donetsk Oblast.

See also
 Bliuminh Stadium

External links
NKMZ 
NKMZ 

Engineering companies of Ukraine
Manufacturing companies of Ukraine
Economy of Donetsk Oblast
Manufacturing companies of the Soviet Union
Ukrainian brands
Buildings and structures in Kramatorsk
Ministry of Heavy and Transport Machine-Building (Soviet Union)